The Benning Road–H Street Limited Line, designated Route X9, is a limited stop MetroExtra bus route operated by the Washington Metropolitan Area Transit Authority between Capitol Heights station, which is served by the Blue and Silver lines of the Washington Metro, and Gallery Place station, which is served by the Red, Green and Yellow lines of the Washington Metro. The line operates every 15-16 minutes at all times on weekdays only. Trips are roughly 50 minutes long. During weekday midday, Route X9 is shortened to operate to Minnesota Avenue station, which is served by the Orange line of the Washington Metro. This line provides additional service along the H Street corridor supplementing routes X1, X2 and X3.

Background
Route X9 operates on weekdays only between Capitol Heights station and Gallery Place station with midday trips being shortened to Minnesota Avenue station. This route provides additional service to routes X1 and X2 along H Street and Benning Road while providing additional service to routes V2 and V4 along Nannie Helen Burroughs Avenue. Route X9 operates out of Southern Avenue Division. The route would only serve all local stops and would detour along Eastern Avenue if there are moderate snow conditions.

Current Stops

History
Route X9 originally operated as part of the East Capitol Street Express Line which operated alongside the Benning Road Line with routes X1, X2, X3, X4, X5, X6, and X7. Route X9 originally operated between Capitol Heights station and Federal Triangle but was discontinued in the late 1980s and replaced by the Benning Road Line.

In 2010, WMATA released a study along the H Street and Benning Road corridor. As ridership increases along the corridor and consistent delays on the DC Streetcar, WMATA proposed a brand new route X9 to operate between Capitol Heights station and Metro Center station. This was to reduce crowding during the weekday peak-hours and to replace route X3.

On December 19, 2010, route X9 was introduce as a new express bus route to primarily operate along H Street, Benning Road and Nannie Helen Burroughs Avenue. This new route will operate during the weekday peak-hours between Capitol Heights station and Metro Center station. The new X9 will supplement route U2 between Capitol Heights and Minnesota Avenue station and route X2 between Minnesota Avenue and Metro Center. 

In June 2012, WMATA announced that the "express" brand for Metro will be renamed into the MetroExtra brand. Route X9 was slowly converted into the MetroExtra brand in the fall of 2012. There were no major changes to the routing.

On September 26, 2017, as part of WMATA's FY2018 budget, WMATA proposed to add midday service to route X9. This proposed was in part to customer demand and requests and jurisdictional coordination and responds to requests by the District Department of Transportation. Route X9 will provides additional limited-stop capacity to accommodate new riders in the Benning Road-H Street corridor during the weekday midday to help route X2 and provide a weekday midday transfer-free ride throughout the entire corridor on proposed Route X9 between downtown DC and Capitol Heights station. This proposal was also recommended in the 2010 Benning Road-H Street Lines Service Evaluation Study.

On June 24, 2018, route X9 was given new weekday midday service which will operate every 15 minutes between Minnesota Avenue station and Metro Center station. Differences in the routing was route X9 will enter the Minnesota Avenue bus bays during the midday hours while during weekday peak-hours, the route would serve the on-street bus stop at Minnesota Avenue.

Route X9 was suspended during the COVID-19 pandemic on March 16, 2020. However the route returned to service on August 24, 2020.

In February 2021 during the FY2022 budget, WMATA proposed to eliminate the X9 portion between Minnesota Avenue and Capitol Heights station if WMATA does not get any federal funding.

On December 11, 2022, all westbound X9 trips was shortened to terminate at Gallery Place station.

References

2010 establishments in Washington, D.C.
X9
Street railways in Washington, D.C.